Boštjan Maček (born 17 June 1972 in Murska Sobota, SR Slovenia) is a sport shooter competing in trap. Maček represented Slovenia at the 2012 Summer Olympics in London, where he finished 7th in the qualification, with 121 rounds, thus missing the finals of best six.

Outside sports, Maček is employed as a truck driver at the Mlinotest bakery.

References

External links

1979 births
Living people
Slovenian male sport shooters
Olympic shooters of Slovenia
Shooters at the 2012 Summer Olympics
Shooters at the 2016 Summer Olympics
Prekmurje Slovenes
People from Murska Sobota
European Games competitors for Slovenia
Shooters at the 2015 European Games
Shooters at the 2019 European Games
21st-century Slovenian people